Chambercombe Manor is a Norman manor house located near Ilfracombe, Devon, which dates back to the 11th century and was recorded in the Domesday Book.

History 
The Manor was owned by the Champernon family until the 15th century, when it passed through various families until 1979 when it was donated to the Chambercombe Manor Trust. The house lost its status as an estate at some point, and for a long time it was used as a farmhouse. However, it did not lose its former grandeur during this period, and today the manor is open to the public. The house contains eight period rooms available to view, ranging from Elizabethan to Victorian. The manor has featured in a number of television programmes.

References

External links 

Chambercombe Manor English Heritage

Country houses in Devon
Historic house museums in Devon
Former manors in Devon
Grade II* listed buildings in Devon
Ilfracombe
Grade II* listed houses
Buildings and structures in Ilfracombe